Ambo  is a town in central Peru. Ambo is the capital of the province Ambo in the region Huánuco.

It was the birthplace of Bishop Ricardo Durand Flórez, third Bishop of Callao.

References

Populated places in the Huánuco Region